Sphaerularia is a genus of nematodes belonging to the family Sphaerulariidae.

The species of this genus are found in Europe and Northern America.

Species:

Sphaerularia bombi 
Sphaerularia vespae

References

Nematodes